Francis Jay Miltner (September 29, 1917 – died April 29, 1991) was an American radio and television announcer and news anchor, long associated with WKYC-TV in Cleveland, Ohio and its onetime sister radio outlet for four decades.

Miltner's association with the then-NBC-owned Cleveland outlet began with its radio station, WTAM, in 1947, where he frequently appeared as a singer. When in 1948 NBC launched its television station, originally called WNBK on channel 4, Miltner joined as announcer and newscaster.  He remained with the station all through its nine-year (1956–1965) run under Westinghouse Broadcasting ownership as KYW-TV, and stayed after NBC was forced back to Cleveland in 1965.

After the station adopted its current call letters of WKYC-TV, Miltner was one of the first hosts (with Bud Dancy and Linda Hunt) of a mid-afternoon show, Three on the Town, which ran with a succession of hosts through 1968.  He continued, over the years, as a live booth announcer with channel 3, to the point where he became known as the "Voice of WKYC."  In his final years with the station, he was the opening announcer for the morning show AM Cleveland.  He retired from WKYC in 1986.

Miltner died in Cuyahoga County, Ohio of lung cancer at age 73.

References, sources and links

 Obituary in Variety, June 17, 1991.
  Articles in Cleveland Classic Media blog relating to Jay Miltner
 
 

Deaths from cancer in Ohio
Radio personalities from Cleveland
Television anchors from Cleveland
Deaths from lung cancer
Radio and television announcers
1917 births
1991 deaths
Journalists from Ohio
20th-century American journalists
American male journalists